Alessio Celadoni di Celadonia (died 1517) was a Roman Catholic prelate who served as Bishop of Molfetta (1508–1517) and Bishop of Gallipoli (1494–1508).

Biography
In 1494, Alessio Celadoni di Celadonia was appointed during the papacy of Pope Alexander VI as Bishop of Gallipoli.
On 7 June 1508, he was transferred by Pope Julius II to the diocese of Molfetta.
He served as Bishop of Molfetta until his death in 1517.

References

External links and additional sources
 (for Chronology of Bishops) 
 (for Chronology of Bishops) 
 (for Chronology of Bishops) 
 (for Chronology of Bishops) 

15th-century Italian Roman Catholic bishops
Bishops appointed by Pope Alexander VI
Bishops appointed by Pope Julius II
1517 deaths
Bishops of Molfetta
16th-century Italian Roman Catholic bishops